The Federal Correctional Institution, Schuylkill (FCI Schuylkill) is a medium-security United States federal prison for male inmates in Pennsylvania. It is operated by the Federal Bureau of Prisons, a division of the United States Department of Justice. The facility has an adjacent minimum-security satellite prison camp which also houses male offenders.

FCI Schuylkill is located in north-central Schuylkill County, 46 miles north the state capital of Harrisburg, and 175 miles north of Washington, D.C.

History
On April 22, 1987, the Federal Bureau of Prisons announced that a $40 million medium-security federal prison housing 500 to 600 inmates would be built in Schuylkill County, Pennsylvania. The project was expected to create 250 new prison jobs and an estimated 144 non-prison jobs. Various politicians, including US Senators Arlen Specter and John Heinz, and economic development groups such as the Schuylkill Economic Development Corporation, had lobbied vigorously for the project for three years.

Notable Inmates

Current

Former

See also
List of U.S. federal prisons
Federal Bureau of Prisons
Incarceration in the United States

References

Buildings and structures in Schuylkill County, Pennsylvania
Prisons in Pennsylvania
Schuylkill
1980s establishments in Pennsylvania